Juwon Quantavious Young (born June 4, 1995) is an American football linebacker who is currently a free agent. He played college football at Miami and Marshall.

Professional career

Detroit Lions
After going undrafted in the 2019 NFL Draft, Young was signed by the Detroit Lions as an undrafted free agent on May 13, 2019. He was waived on June 3, 2019.

Seattle Seahawks
On August 10, 2019, Young was signed by the Seattle Seahawks. He was waived on August 31, 2019.

References

External links
Seattle Seahawks bio
Marshall Thundering Herd bio
Miami Hurricanes bio

1998 births
Living people
Sportspeople from Albany, Georgia
African-American players of American football
American football linebackers
Players of American football from Georgia (U.S. state)
Marshall Thundering Herd football players
Miami Hurricanes football players
Detroit Lions players
Seattle Seahawks players
21st-century African-American sportspeople